Nong Bua Junction railway station is a railway station located in Taling Chan Subdistrict, Saraburi City, Saraburi. It was made a junction with the Eastern Line Phra Phutthachai Freight Branch following the construction of the chord line in 2019 which formed a wye at the original branch point between Nong Bua and Kaeng Khoi Junction.

Train services 

 Ordinary No. 233/234 Bangkok–Surin–Bangkok
 Commuter No. 339/340 Bangkok–Kaeng Khoi Junction–Bangkok (weekdays only)
 Commuter No. 341/342 Bangkok–Kaeng Khoi Junction–Bangkok (weekdays only)
 Commuter No. 343/344 Bangkok–Kaeng Khoi Junction–Bangkok (weekends only)

References 

Railway stations in Thailand
Saraburi province